Sophie Prieur (active late 18th century) was a French painter. Her date of birth and death are unknown.

Prier primarily painted portraits and still lifes. Her portrait of Marie Antoinette currently resides at the Carnavalet Museum in Paris.

18th-century French painters
Year of birth unknown
Year of death unknown